The 1929 Arizona State Bulldogs football team was an American football team that represented Arizona State Teachers College (later renamed Arizona State University) as an independent during the 1929 college football season. In their seventh and final season under head coach Aaron McCreary, the Bulldogs compiled a 0–6 record, were shut out in four of six games, and were outscored by all opponents by a combined total of 143 to 13. Dick Finley was the team captain.

Schedule

References

Arizona State
Arizona State Sun Devils football seasons
College football winless seasons
Arizona State Sun Devils football